The Pacific Seacraft 34 is a bluewater cruising yacht produced since 1984 by Pacific Seacraft of Washington, North Carolina. Although of GRP construction, the yacht is traditionally built with a cutter rig, skeg-hung rudder, canoe stern and semi-long keel. The yacht is a cruising design, with a high displacement and the characteristic 'canoe' stern of Bill Crealock.

See also
Pacific Seacraft 31
Pacific Seacraft 37

External links
Pacific Seacraft
The Pacific Seacraft 34
data and overview on sailboat.guide
Pacific Seacraft 34 design and sailing characteristics, reviews, videos, outfitting ideas

Sailing yachts
Boats designed by W. I. B. Crealock
1980s sailboat type designs
Sailboat types built by Pacific Seacraft